Fragaria iinumae is a species of strawberry native to Japan and eastern Russia.

All strawberries have a base haploid count of 7 chromosomes. Fragaria iinumae is diploid, having 2 pairs of these chromosomes for a total of 14 chromosomes. Fragaria iinumae is one of the diploid progenitors of the octoploid strawberry.

See also 
 Alpine plant

References

External links
 

iinumae
Plants described in 1907